Daniel Lawrence is a Jamaican politician from the Labour Party.

References 

Living people
People from Westmoreland Parish
21st-century Jamaican politicians
Members of the House of Representatives of Jamaica
Jamaica Labour Party politicians
Year of birth missing (living people)
Members of the 14th Parliament of Jamaica